Oversight Systems is a U.S.-based company, founded in 2003, which develops and markets computer software that is intended to help businesses identify employee and vendor fraud, misuse and errors with expense reporting, and billing issues. The software also helps public companies with the monitoring and testing of controls associated with Sarbanes-Oxley Act and the Foreign Corrupt Practices Act (FCPA) compliance. Oversight's claimed target customers are companies taking in US$600 million or more in yearly revenue.

Ownership 
On September 2, 2020 Oversight was acquired by TCV, with Luminate Capital Partners retaining a minority equity partnership.

Oversight Systems' software is intended to detect payments to suspicious vendors and alert authorities when insufficient people are involved in complicated business processes. If a transaction or associated entity is in violation of a given policy, a report is generated and the workflow system transmits the report via e-mail, the user interface and periodic reports.

References

Companies established in 2003
Defunct software companies of the United States